The Kazakhstan women's national 3x3 team is a national basketball team of Kazakhstan, administered by the Kazakhstan Basketball Federation.
It represents the country in international 3x3 (3 against 3) women's basketball competitions.

See also
Kazakhstan men's national 3x3 team
Kazakhstan women's national basketball team

References

Kazakhstan women's national basketball team
Women's national 3x3 basketball teams